Guido Schmidt (15 January 1901 – 5 December 1957) was an Austrian diplomat and politician, who served as Foreign Minister from 1936 to 1938.

Life
Born in Bludenz, Vorarlberg, Schmidt attended the Stella Matutina Jesuit school in Feldkirch, where he met with the later Austrian Chancellor Kurt Schuschnigg. He studied law at the University of Vienna, receiving his doctorate in 1924 and the next year he joined the Austrian diplomatic service. From 1927 he served in the office of President Wilhelm Miklas, promoted to the rank of a vice-director in 1928.

Schmidt was a member of the Christian Social Party and in 1933 joined the Fatherland's Front under Chancellor Engelbert Dollfuss. He played an important part in the conclusion of the 1936 "July Agreement" of the Austrofascist government of Dollfuss' successor Kurt Schuschnigg with Nazi Germany and in turn was appointed State Secretary of Foreign Affairs. He and Interior Minister Edmund Glaise-Horstenau served as the main contact men to the German Nazi government. On 12 February 1938 Schuschnigg under pressure from Hitler elevated Schmidt to the rank of a Federal Minister, a post he held until 11 March 1938, when the chancellor was forced to resign only hours before the invasion of Wehrmacht troops and the Austrian Anschluss to Nazi Germany. Schmidt played a vital role in the preceding demission of Chief of Staff Alfred Jansa, nevertheless he did not join the Nazi government of Arthur Seyss-Inquart, whereafter he retired from politics.

By the intercession of Hermann Göring he became an executive director of the Reichswerke industrial conglomerate at Linz on 1 July 1938. In 1945, Schmidt was temporarily imprisoned by the Allied occupation forces because of his pro-Nazi attitude and accused of high treason, but was acquitted in 1947. From 1950 he continued his career as a member of the executive board of the Semperit company. Schmidt died in Vienna at the age of 56. He was the father of the Austrian businessman Guido Schmidt-Chiari.

Works
 Der Hochverratsprozess gegen Dr. Guido Schmidt; Österreichische Staatsdruckerei; Vienna, 1947

See also
 Austrofascism

External links
 

1901 births
1957 deaths
People from Bludenz
Austrian diplomats
Foreign ministers of Austria
Austrian Roman Catholics
Fatherland Front politicians
Austrian fascists